Santino Verbeek (born January 24, 1995) is a Dutch kickboxer currently competing in the Welterweight (83.9 kg) division.

He has competed in the Netherlands-based World Fighting League promotion, where he is a former WFL 86kg Champion.

Titles and accomplishments
 2019 World Fighting League −86 kg Champion
 2018 World Fighting League −86 kg Champion

Professional kickboxing record

|-  style="background:#fbb;"
| 2022-12-18|| Loss ||align=left| Vinicius Dinizio || HOOST CUP KINGS NAGOYA 12 || Nagoya, Japan || Decision (Majority)|| 3 || 3:00
|-  style="background:#CCFFCC;"
| 2022-03-22|| Win||align=left| Petros Vardakas || Kickboxing Fearless N°10 || Wassenaar, Netherlands || Ext.R Decision || 4 || 3:00
|-
|-  style="background:#FFBBBB;"
| 2021-10-06|| Loss ||align=left| Michael Boapeah || RINGS Nieuwegein || Nieuwegein, Netherlands || Decision || 3 || 3:00
|-  style="background:#fbb;"
| 2021-05-28|| Loss ||align=left| Miles Simson || ONE Championship: Full Blast || Kallang, Singapore || Decision (Unanimous) || 3 || 3:00
|-  style="background:#CCFFCC;"
| 2019-09-06|| Win ||align=left| Juan Cervantes || ONE Championship: Immortal Triumph || Ho Chi Minh City, Vietnam || Decision (Majority) || 3 || 3:00
|-  style="background:#CCFFCC;"
| 2019-02-17|| Win||align=left| Dennis Ipema ||World Fighting League|| Hoofddorp, Netherlands || Decision || 5 || 3:00
|-
! style=background:white colspan=9 |
|-  style="background:#CCFFCC;"
| 2018-12-23|| Win ||align=left| Julio Mori || HOOST CUP KINGS NAGOYA 5 || Nagoya, Japan || KO (Left Straight) || 1 || 1:23
|-  style="background:#CCFFCC;"
| 2018-10-21|| Win||align=left| Fernando Groenhart ||World Fighting League, 86 kg Tournament Final|| Hoofddorp, Netherlands || Decision || 3 || 3:00
|-
! style=background:white colspan=9 |
|-  style="background:#CCFFCC;"
| 2018-10-21|| Win||align=left| Arno Van Der Lugt ||World Fighting League, 86 kg Tournament Semi Final|| Hoofddorp, Netherlands || Decision || 3 || 3:00
|-  style="background:#FFBBBB;"
| 2018-09-29|| Loss||align=left| Serdar Yiğit Eroğlu |||| Malatya, Turkey || Decision || 3 || 3:00
|-  style="background:#CCFFCC;"
| 2018-07-07|| Win||align=left| Dennis Stolzenbach ||Road2Victory / World Fighting League|| Volendam, Netherlands || KO (Right High Kick)|| 2 || 2:15
|-  style="background:#FFBBBB;"
| 2018-05-12|| Loss||align=left| Samet Keser |||| Turkey || Decision || 3 || 3:00
|-  style="background:#CCFFCC;"
| 2018-04-15|| Win ||align=left| Konstadelopoulos Stefanos || Spartan's Night I || Greece || Decision (Unanimous) || 3 || 3:00
|-  style="background:#FFBBBB;"
| 2018-03-25|| Loss||align=left| Dennis Ipema ||World Fighting League|| Almere, Netherlands || Decision || 3 || 3:00
|-  style="background:#CCFFCC;"
| 2018-02-17|| Win ||align=left| Petros Vardakas || Road 2 Victory III by Sokudo Gym || Hoogwoud, Netherlands || Decision || 3 || 3:00
|-  style="background:#FFBBBB;"
| 2017-11-18|| Loss||align=left| Robin Ciric || Enfusion #56 || Groningen, Netherlands || Extra Round Decision || 4 || 3:00
|-  style="background:#c5d2ea;"
| 2017-10-14|| Draw||align=left| Gilberto van Es || Road 2 Victory II || Volendam, Netherlands || Decision || 3 || 3:00
|-  style="background:#c5d2ea;"
| 2017-05-13|| Draw||align=left| Badr Ferdous || Fight League 6 || Nieuw-Vennep, Netherlands || Decision || 3 || 3:00
|-  style="background:#CCFFCC;"
| 2017-04-08|| Win ||align=left| Petros Vardakas || Road 2 Victory Sokudo || Hoorn, Netherlands || Decision || 3 || 3:00
|-  style="background:#CCFFCC;"
| 2016-09-03|| Win ||align=left| Liu Yuan || Wu Lin Feng 2016: Netherlands VS China || Zhengzhou, China || Decision (Unanimous) || 3 || 3:00
|-  style="background:#CCFFCC;"
| 2016-05-07|| Win ||align=left| Benjamin Masudi || No Limit Gym Fight Night || Belgium || Decision (Unanimous) || 3 || 3:00
|-  style="background:#CCFFCC;"
| 2016-03-19|| Win ||align=left| Mohammed el Boulahiati || Sokudo Fight Night || Hoogwoud, Netherlands || KO (Left Hook) || 1 ||
|-  style="background:#FFBBBB;"
| 2016-01-23|| Loss ||align=left| Bilal Boudal || Sportmani Events VIII || Amsterdam, Netherlands || Decision || 3 || 3:00
|-  style="background:#CCFFCC;"
| 2015-10-18|| Win ||align=left| Justin Dap || World Fighting League || Hoofddorp, Netherlands || Decision || 3 || 3:00
|-
| colspan=9 | Legend:

References

1995 births
Living people
Dutch male kickboxers
ONE Championship kickboxers